Necropsobacter massiliensis is a Gram-negative and non-motile bacterium from the genus of Necropsobacter which has been isolated from a cervical abscess from a Senegalese boy from Dakar in Senegal.

References

Pasteurellales
Bacteria described in 2015